Mona Nørgaard (born 23 February 1948) is a Danish orienteering competitor. She won gold medal in the individual contest at the 1974 World Orienteering Championships, ahead of Kristin Cullman.

See also
 Danish orienteers
 List of orienteers
 List of orienteering events

References

1948 births
Living people
Danish orienteers
Female orienteers
Foot orienteers
World Orienteering Championships medalists